Salvation Station is the second full-length studio album from Canadian CCM band Newworldson, released on February 12, 2008.  Christianity Today voted Salvation Station number 3 on their list of Best Christian Albums of the year 2008.  It was also selected as one of the twenty best albums of 2008 by Cross Rhythms. The album hit number 26 on Billboard magazines's Top Heatseekers chart in 2008, and 34 on the Top Christian Albums chart.

The album won the 2008 Gospel Music Association Canada Covenant Award for Folk/Roots Album Of The Year.  It also received a nomination for Contemporary Christian/Gospel Album Of The Year at the Juno Awards of 2009.

All the songs were written by Joel Parisien, Mark Rogers, Richard Moore and Joshua Franklin Toal, except "Borderline", written by Joel Parisien, Mark Rogers, Richard Moore, Joshua Franklin Toal and Jonah Nadir Omowale.  Salvation Station was preceded by a five track sampler that was sold at concerts prior to the album's release.

Track listing

Personnel
 Joel Parisien - organ, pianos, clavinet, vocals
 Josh Toal - guitars, vocals
 Rich Moore - upright bass, vocals
 Mark Rogers - drums, cymbals, percussion
 Andy Parisien - background vocal on "Waiting' Till The Rapture Come"

References

2008 albums
Newworldson albums